The 1957–58 Serie A season was won by Juventus.

Teams
Hellas Verona and Alessandria had been promoted from Serie B.

Final classification
This season was influenced by the Belfast disaster. Following the defeat of the Italy national football team by Northern Ireland, the sole elimination of Italy from the FIFA World Cup before 2018, the Italian government appointed a commissioner to the FIGC. A reduction of the Serie A to 16 clubs was imposed, with a single promotion from the Serie B and three relegations, but the Football League disagreed. The League won the dispute, and the reduction was annulled establishing a playoff between the 17th in Serie A and the 2nd in Serie B. In the meantime, Atalanta was ranked last for a corruption case: the Bergamo club was later accomplished by a judge, but for equity the ordinary, original regulation with two relegations was restored.

Inter and Roma were invited to the 1958–60 Inter-Cities Fairs Cup.SS Lazio was the cupwinner.

Results

Serie A qualification
Hellas Verona had to play two qualification matches against the team that ranked second in Serie B.

Hellas Verona relegated to Serie B.

Top goalscorers

References and sources

Almanacco Illustrato del Calcio - La Storia 1898-2004, Panini Edizioni, Modena, September 2005

External links
  - All results on RSSSF Website.

Serie A seasons
Italy
1957–58 in Italian football leagues